Aleka Kylela Persaud (born 24 February 2006) is a Guyanese swimmer. She competed in the women's 50 metre freestyle at the 2020 Summer Olympics.

References

External links
 

2006 births
Living people
Guyanese female swimmers
Guyanese female freestyle swimmers
Olympic swimmers of Guyana
Swimmers at the 2020 Summer Olympics
Place of birth missing (living people)
Swimmers at the 2022 Commonwealth Games
Commonwealth Games competitors for Guyana